, also written , is a sub-kilometer asteroid, classified as near-Earth object and potentially hazardous asteroid of the Apollo group.

Description 

It was discovered on 26 July 1998 by the Spacewatch program and subsequently lost. It was removed from the Sentry Risk Table on 8 August 2002. It has a well determined orbit with an observation arc of more than 10 years. It is included in the Minor Planet Center list of Potentially Hazardous Asteroids (PHAs) as it comes to within 0.05 AU of Earth periodically. It is also a Mars crossing asteroid

See also 
 99942 Apophis

Notes 

  This is assuming an albedo of 0.25–0.05.

References

External links 
 List Of Apollo Minor Planets, Minor Planet Center
  data at MPC
 List of Potentially Hazardous Asteroids (PHAs)
 
 
 

085640
085640
085640
085640
19980726